Ke jian hao shiguang is the Chinese adaptation of As the Bell Rings. It is adapted from the original series Quelli dell' Intervallo by Disney Channel Italy.

The show is produced by Shanghai City Animation Company, a subsidiary of Wenhui-xinmin United Press Group. It is shown on many regional channels in China through a syndicated show, Dragon Club. The show is also shown in Disney Channel Taiwan, with some characters' voices dubbed in Mandarin by voice actors familiar to Taiwanese audience.

In 2009, the show is adapted into an animated series, also produced by Shanghai City Animation Company. In 2010, the show is adapted into a stage musical performed during Expo 2010 in Shanghai. In 2011, the show is adapted into a Taiwanese version, with the same characters performed by Taiwanese actors, produced in Taiwan.

Characters 
Zhang Jie
Ding Liang
Hu Die
Wen Shanshan
Li Qi
Ma Boshi
Yang Fan
Zhu Zihao
Ding Anan
Di Di
He Liyanying

See also
 As the Bell Rings

2007 Chinese television series debuts
2011 Chinese television series endings
2000s animated television series
2010s animated television series
Chinese children's animated comedy television series
Disney Channels Worldwide original programming
2000s high school television series
2010s high school television series
Chinese high school television series